Redman may refer to:

People
Redman (surname)
Redman (rapper) (born 1970), American vocalist, producer, and actor
Method Man & Redman
Red Dragon (musician) (c. 1966 – 2015), Jamaican deejay Leroy May, who initially worked under the name Redman

Places
United States
Redman, Michigan
Redman, Missouri, an unincorporated community in Macon County
Redman, Scott County, Missouri, a ghost town

Other uses
Homo Sovieticus, people whose minds are shaped by living in the Soviet Union
Red Man, an American brand of chewing tobacco
Red man syndrome, a reaction to the antibiotic vancomycin
Redman (TV series), a Japanese tokusatsu television series
Redman: The Kaiju Hunter (comic book), a comic book by Matt Frank and Gonçalo Lopes based on the tokusatsu series
The Gospel of the Redman, a 1936 book by Ernest Thompson Seton
Red man, a symbol on traffic lights that signal pedestrians to stop
A variation of the term redskin

See also
 Redmen (disambiguation)
 Redmon (disambiguation)
 Crispa Redmanizers, a Filipino basketball team